Two referendums were held in Switzerland during 1945. The first was held on 21 January on a federal law on the Swiss Federal Railways, and was approved by voters. The second was held on 25 November on a federal resolution on the "for the family" petition, and was also approved.

Background
The January referendum on the Swiss Federal Railways was an optional referendum, which required only a simple majority to pass. The November referendum was a mandatory referendum, which required a double majority; a majority of the popular vote and majority of the cantons. The decision of each canton was based on the vote in that canton. Full cantons counted as one vote, whilst half cantons counted as half.

Results

January referendum

November referendum

References

1945 referendums
1945 in Switzerland
Referendums in Switzerland